The New York City Landmarks Preservation Commission (LPC), formed in 1965, is the New York City governmental commission that administers the city's Landmarks Preservation Law. Since its founding, it has designated over a thousand landmarks, classified into four categories: individual landmarks, interior landmarks, scenic landmarks, and historic districts.

The New York City borough of Manhattan contains a high concentration of designated landmarks, interior landmarks and historic districts. The section of Manhattan above 110th Street is known as Upper Manhattan. It includes numerous individual landmarks and historic districts, as well as two scenic landmarks. The following is an incomplete list. Some of these are also National Historic Landmark (NHL) sites, and NHL status is noted where known.

Source:;; date listed is date of designation;

Historic Districts

Individual Landmarks

1 – 9

A – M

N – Z

Interior Landmarks

Scenic Landmarks

See also 
 List of New York City Designated Landmarks in Manhattan below 14th Street
 List of New York City Designated Landmarks in Manhattan from 14th to 59th Streets
 List of New York City Designated Landmarks in Manhattan from 59th to 110th Streets
 National Register of Historic Places listings in New York County, New York
 List of National Historic Landmarks in New York City

References

External links
 NYC Landmarks Preservation Commission
NYC Landmarks Designation Reports
New York City Landmarks Preservation Commission flickr Group

 
Locally designated landmarks in the United States
New York City Landmarks Preservation Commission
Manhattan above 110th